Marginella mosaica, commonly known as the mosaic marginella, is a species of small sea snail, a marine gastropod mollusk in the family Marginellidae.

References

Marginellidae
Gastropods described in 1846